This article contains a list topics related to the Cook Islands:



0-9

A
Avarua

B

C
Communications in the Cook Islands
Cook Islands Maori
Cook Islands Party
Cook, Captain James
Catholic Church in Rarotonga

D
Democratic Party
Demographics of the Cook Islands

E
Economy of the Cook Islands

F

G
Geography of the Cook Islands

H
History of the Cook Islands

I

J

K
Kaoa

L
LGBT rights in the Cook Islands

M
Marae Moana
Music of the Cook Islands

N
New Zealand
Nukutere College

O

P
Pepe and the Rarotongans
Politics of the Cook Islands
Postage stamps and postal history of the Cook Islands

Q

R
Roman Catholic Diocese of Rarotonga
Rugby union in the Cook Islands

S
Sheraton Resort Rarotonga
Sport in the Cook Islands
Survivor: Cook Islands

T
Transport in the Cook Islands

U

V

W

X

Y

Z

See also
Lists of country-related topics - similar lists for other countries

Cook Islands